Eden is a former unincorporated community in Fayette County, Iowa, United States. It was located at the junction of Sunset Road and Spruce Road, four miles northeast of Fayette.

History
 Eden was in the eastern part of Eden Township. Eden's population was 26 in 1925. Eden was marked on county maps as late as the 1930s, but rural migration emptied the community.

References

Unincorporated communities in Fayette County, Iowa
Unincorporated communities in Iowa